Robert George Banks (born 18 January 1937) is a Conservative Party politician in the United Kingdom. He was Member of Parliament for Harrogate from February 1974 until he retired in May 1997.

References
 "Times Guide to the House of Commons", Times Newspapers Limited, 1992 and 1997 editions.

1937 births
Living people
Conservative Party (UK) MPs for English constituencies
UK MPs 1983–1987
UK MPs 1974
UK MPs 1974–1979
UK MPs 1979–1983
UK MPs 1987–1992
UK MPs 1992–1997